This is a list of British television related events from 1945.

Events

There are no events for 1945 in British television, as broadcasting had been suspended for the duration of the Second World War. This was done amid fears that the signals would help German bombers. Television broadcasting resumed in 1946.

Births
 21 January – Martin Shaw, English actor
 4 February – Tony Haygarth, English actor (died 2017)
 13 February – Simon Schama, historian
 16 February – Jeremy Bulloch, English actor (died 2020)
 7 April – Martyn Lewis, television news presenter and journalist
 10 April – James Bate, actor (died 1992)
 21 April – Diana Darvey, actress, singer and dancer (died 2000)
 14 May – Francesca Annis, actress
 3 June – Bill Paterson, Scottish actor
 15 June – Nicola Pagett, Egyptian-born actress (died 2021)
 10 July – John Motson, football commentator (died 2023)
 26 July – Helen Mirren, actress
 1 August – Laila Morse, actress
 5 August – Martin Lambie-Nairn, designer (died 2020)
 6 August – Ron Jones, director (died 1993)
 14 September – Martin Tyler, football commentator
 14 October – Lesley Joseph, actress 
 30 December – Davy Jones, English singer, member of The Monkees (died 2012)

See also
 1945 in British music
 1945 in the United Kingdom
 List of British films of 1945

References